Rhondda Cynon Taf is a county borough in South Wales. It has 89 scheduled monuments, seven of which cross or are on a border with a neighbouring authority. Of the 54 prehistoric sites, 40 are burial sites, with four hillforts and ten domestic and hut circle sites. There are three Roman sites, all military in purpose, and a variety of medieval mottes, churches, houses and a bridge. The 17 post-medieval sites are various forms of industrial and transport-related sites.

Scheduled monuments have statutory protection. The compilation of the list is undertaken by Cadw Welsh Historic Monuments, which is an executive agency of the National Assembly of Wales. The list of scheduled monuments below is supplied by Cadw with additional material from RCAHMW and Glamorgan-Gwent Archaeological Trust.

Scheduled monuments in Rhondda Cynon Taf

See also
List of Cadw properties
List of castles in Wales
List of hill forts in Wales
Historic houses in Wales
List of monastic houses in Wales
List of museums in Wales
List of Roman villas in Wales
Grade I listed buildings in Rhondda Cynon Taff
Grade II* listed buildings in Rhondda Cynon Taff

References
Coflein is the online database of RCAHMW: Royal Commission on the Ancient and Historical Monuments of Wales, GGAT is the Glamorgan-Gwent Archaeological Trust, Cadw is the Welsh Historic Monuments Agency

Rhondda Cynon Taf
Buildings and structures in Rhondda Cynon Taf